Maumelle Ordnance Works Locomotive 1 is a gasoline-powered, mechanically driven, two-axle railway locomotive which was built in 1942 by Vulcan Iron Works (of Wilkes-Barre, Pennsylvania) for the United States War Department's Maumelle Ordnance Works.  It was added to the U.S. National Register of Historic Places in 2006 and is preserved at the Fort Smith Trolley Museum.

History

The Maumelle Ordnance Works were built by the War Department in 1941 to produce the explosives picric acid, ammonium picrate, and ammonium nitrate. The plant stopped production in August 1945 and was decontaminated and shut down by November. The land passed through several hands and eventually became the planned community of Maumelle, Arkansas.

The Arkansas nomination document says that locomotive #1 was then transferred to the Army, renumbered 8223, and sent to the Newport Army Air Field.  The airfield, however, had been renamed "Marine Corps Air Facility Newport" in 1944 and turned over to the City of Newport at the end of the war.

Wherever it spent the period after the war, in the early 1950s the government sold the locomotive to the Augusta Railroad, a  line that connected Augusta, Arkansas, near Broadway and 1st Street, to the Missouri Pacific at 6th Street in New Augusta.  Parts of the railroad right of way are still obvious on the Google aerial view. The little gasoline locomotive replaced a 1924 Alco 2-6-0 steam locomotive that had been condemned. During the 1950s, the railroad gradually died, as its traffic shifted to trucks. The railroad went through an abandonment proceeding in 1958 and was purchased by Glenn Taggart and Bing Miller. Subsequently, Tommy Taggart bought Miller's interest. He kept the locomotive until he donated it to the Fort Smith Trolley Museum in June 1988.

Design

Locomotive #1 is an unusual combination.  Virtually all internal combustion locomotives are diesel-electrics, powered by a diesel prime mover driving a generator which in turn drives one or more electric traction motors; apart from some diesel-mechanical and diesel-hydraulic locomotives.  All of the major manufacturers had discarded the use of gasoline engines by the middle 1930s in favor of diesel, primarily on the grounds of fuel economy.  Vulcan continued to produce a very limited number of both while it also continued to produce steam locomotives.  In early 1942 it is likely that war needs made it easier to get a gasoline engine than a diesel because a gasoline engine uses much less material.

Electric drive is almost universal because a railroad locomotive is a difficult environment for a mechanical gearbox, as the loads vary widely from second to second as the slack action runs in and out. Only on very small locomotives, pulling a limited number of cars, generally on level track, have there been any successful gearbox locomotive drives.  In the case of Locomotive 1, the four-speed gearbox drives a jackshaft under the cab which is connected with side rods to the two driving wheels. The choice of mechanical drive may also have been driven by war availability – a generator and traction motor take hundreds of pounds of copper, which was scarce.

The nomination document quotes a Vulcan ad in the 1947 Locomotive Cyclopedia, ""All Vulcan diesel and gasoline geared locomotives are equipped with a distinctive four-speed, constant-mesh, spur-geared transmission which permits easy gear changes at relatively high speeds.  Gears and shafts are heat-treated nickel-chromium steel mounted on anti-friction bearings and operating in an oil bath.  Extra-heavy cross-equalized semi-elliptic springs and Vulcan 3-point suspension assure easy riding on rough track and minimize derailments."

It was added to the National Register of Historic Places in 2006.

References

Sebastian County, Arkansas
B locomotives
Locomotives of the United States
Vulcan Iron Works locomotives
Railway locomotives on the National Register of Historic Places in Arkansas
Railway locomotives introduced in 1942
Standard gauge locomotives of the United States
National Register of Historic Places in Sebastian County, Arkansas
Transportation in Woodruff County, Arkansas